Harpiola is a genus (or possibly subgenus) of vesper bats within the subfamily Murininae.  It contains Peters's tube-nosed bat (Harpiola grisea) and the Formosan golden tube-nosed bat (Harpiola isodon).

References

Murininae
Bat genera
Taxa named by Oldfield Thomas